Vladimiro-Nikolayevsky is a rural locality (a khutor) in Zilairsky Selsoviet, Zilairsky District, Bashkortostan, Russia. The population was 27 as of 2010. There are 3 streets.

Geography 
Vladimiro-Nikolayevsky is located 24 km southeast of Zilair (the district's administrative centre) by road. Vasilyevka is the nearest rural locality.

References 

Rural localities in Zilairsky District